A Celtic button knot is a stopper knot on a single rope that results in a spherical decorative knot with hair braid / basket weave pattern. It is essentially a single strand Turk's Head Knot that is structured such a way that it is effectively tied around the rope itself, creating a stopper. It typically is used as a button, or as a knot securing the end of the rope from fraying.

Tying

There are 4 main steps to tying the Celtic knot:
  two consecutive overhand loops, the last one placed partially over the first forming two petals of a four petal flower
  left end woven from right horizontally through the loops; over, under, over, under forming the third petal 
  left end woven again from left: over the edge, under, under, over and up through the central hole finishing the four petal flower
  optional: pushing the end again into the knot following the main part consistently on the inside. This may be repeated to give volume to the knot
 tightening evenly to close the petals of the flower forming a sphere around the main part

References 

Decorative knots
Stopper knots